Chinese punctuation has punctuation marks that are derived from both Chinese and Western sources. Although there was a long native tradition of textual annotation to indicate the boundaries of sentences and clauses, the concept of punctuation marks being a mandatory and integral part of the text was only adapted in the written language during the 20th century due to Western influence. Before that, the concept of punctuation in Chinese literature existed mainly in the form of judou, a system of annotations denoting stops and pauses. However, unlike modern punctuation, judou marks were added into a text by scholars to aid comprehension, and for pedagogical purposes and were not viewed as an integral part of the text. Classical texts were therefore generally transmitted without judou. In most cases, this did not interfere with the interpretation of a text, although there were occasionally ambiguous passages as a result of this practice.

The first book to be printed with modern punctuation was Outline of the History of Chinese Philosophy by Hu Shih, published in 1919. Traditional poetry and calligraphy maintains the punctuation-free style. However, most editions of classical texts published since the 1930s are punctuated with fully modern punctuation (or at least using the modern equivalents of the traditional judou marks). The usage of punctuation is regulated by the Chinese national standard GB/T 15834–2011 "General rules for punctuation".

Shape of punctuation marks

Many ancient Chinese books contain thousands of words with no spaces between them; however, when necessary to explicitly denote a pause or break, Judou marks such as "" and "" were used. Similar to the development of punctuation in Europe, there were varying types of Judou marks. For instance, a Song Dynasty print of Chronicles of Huayang used full-width spaces to denote a stop, whereas a print of Jingdian Shiwen from the same dynasty simply used "" and "" marks. Also, Qu Yuan's Li Sao used the character  and grammatical particles to denote stops, similar to Judou marks. In Chinese writing, each character conforms to a roughly square frame so that the text as a whole can fit into a grid. Because of this, East Asian punctuation marks are larger than their European counterparts, as they should occupy a square area that is the same size as the characters around them. These punctuation marks are called fullwidth to contrast them from halfwidth European punctuation marks.

Chinese characters can be written horizontally or vertically. Some punctuation marks adapt to this change in direction: the parentheses, square brackets, square quotation marks, book title marks, ellipsis marks, and dashes all rotate 90° clockwise when used in vertical text. The three underline-like punctuation marks in Chinese (proper noun mark, wavy book title mark, and emphasis mark) rotate and shift to the left side of the text in vertical script (shifting to the right side of the text is also possible, but this is outmoded and can clash with the placement of other punctuation marks).

Marks similar to European punctuation
Marks imported from Europe are fullwidth instead of halfwidth like their original European counterparts, thus incorporating more space, and no longer need to be followed by an additional space in typesetting:

  (U+FF0C ) is the comma. It cannot be used for enumerating a list; see "enumeration comma" below.
  (U+FF01 ) is the exclamation mark (!).
  (U+FF1F ) is the question mark (?).
  (U+FF1B ) is the semicolon.
  (U+FF1A ) is the colon.
  (U+FF08 ), (U+FF09 ) are parentheses (round brackets).
 There are two kinds of square brackets:
  (U+FF3B ), (U+FF3D )
  (U+3010 ), (U+3011 )

Other punctuation

Other punctuation symbols are more different, in shape or usage:

Punctuation marks
 Period
 The Chinese period (U+3002 ) is a fullwidth small circle. In horizontal writing, the period is placed in the middle , however in Mainland China it is placed in the bottom left ; in vertical writing, it is placed below and to the right of the last character ︒(U+FE12 ) in Mainland China, and in the middle  in Taiwan, Hong Kong, and Macau.
 Quotation marks
 Traditional Chinese does not use European quotation marks. The double quotation marks are used when embedded within single quotation marks: . In vertical text, quotation marks are rotated 90° clockwise ( (U+FE41 , U+FE42 )).
 Simplified Chinese officially prescribes European-style quotation marks for horizontal text and Chinese quotation marks for vertical text. Single quotation marks are used when embedded within double quotation marks: . These quotation marks are fullwidth in printed matter but share the same codepoints as the European quotation marks in Unicode, so they require a Chinese-language font to be displayed correctly. In vertical text, corner brackets rotated 90° clockwise, are used as in Traditional Chinese. However, corner brackets are commonly encountered in situations that normally necessitate European punctuation, including in official contexts and media.
 Enumeration comma
  The enumeration comma (U+3001 ) or "dun comma" must be used instead of the regular comma when separating words constituting a list. Chinese language does not traditionally observe the English custom of a serial comma (the comma before conjunctions in a list), although the issue is of little consequence in Chinese at any rate, as the English "A, B, and C" is more likely to be rendered in Chinese as "" or more often as "", without any word for "and", see picture to the right.
 Middle dot
 Chinese uses a middle dot to separate characters in non-Han personal names, such as Tibetan, Uyghur, etc. For example "Nur Bekri", the name of a Chinese politician of Uyghur descent is rendered as "". "Leonardo da Vinci" is often transcribed to Mandarin as: . The middle dot is also fullwidth in printed matter, while the halfwidth middle dot is also used in computer input, which is then rendered as fullwidth in Chinese-language fonts.
 In Taiwan, the hyphenation point (U+2027 ) is used instead for the same purpose. They can also be used to represent decimal points in Chinese. For example "3.5" becomes 「三．五」.
 Title marks
 For titles of books, films, and so on, Simplified Chinese officially uses fullwidth double angle brackets  (U+300A , U+300B ), and fullwidth single angle brackets,  (U+3008 , U+3009 ). The latter is used when embedded within the former: . Although  (wavy underline, U+FE4F ) is the officially prescribed title mark by Taiwan's Ministry of Education (especially for handwriting), when typing, square brackets【 】 and double quotation marks 『 』are also de facto used, if not prescribed by dictionaries in a manner akin to Korean and Japanese; Simplified Chinese often does likewise for song titles. In practice, Traditional Chinese, single title marks are also used for articles in or sections of a book, a rule that is also officially prescribed for Simplified Chinese. Furthermore, unsanctioned and alternate usage of Western or Chinese quotation marks is rather common, especially so for Chinese quotation marks in Traditional Chinese newspapers; this "unsanctioned practice" is also commonly found in Japanese and Korean.
 Ellipsis
 In Chinese, the ellipsis is written with six dots (not three) occupying the same space as two characters in the center of a line.
 Unicode provides an explicitly centered  character in addition to the inexplicit  character.
 Em dash
 Similarly, the em dash is written so that it occupies the space of two characters in the center of the line. There should be no breaking in the line.
 En dash
 When connecting two words to signify a range, Chinese generally uses a  en dash occupying the space of one character (e.g.  "January to July", which can also be written 1月到7月, with the character 到 in place of the dash). A single em dash character, or a tilde may also be used.
 Wavy dash
 The wavy dash (U+FF5E ) can also signify a range in Chinese (e.g.  "5 to 20 words"). It is more commonly but not exclusively used when the numbers are estimates (e.g. circa dates and temperatures in weather forecasts). For the most part, however, the en dash and wavy dash are interchangeable; usage is largely a matter of personal taste or institutional style. 
 In informal use (such as texting), wavy dashes are also used to indicate a prolonged vowel similar to informal English's repeated letters (e.g.  "waaah") or to indicate stress in places where English would employ an emphatic tone marked variously by italics or bolding (e.g.  "I want it!").
 Spacing
 Similar to the spacing between letters (kerning) in European languages, Chinese writing uses a very narrow space between characters, though it does not observe the equivalent to the wider space between words except on rare occasions. Chinese particularly classical Chinese is thus a form of scriptio continua and it is common for words to be split between lines with no marking in the text equivalent to the English hyphen.
 When a space is used, it is also fullwidth (U+3000 ). One instance of its usage is as an honorific marker. This use is also still current in very formal letters or other old-style documents, as well as religious scripture.
 When Chinese is romanized, spaces are used to assist in reading. Rules vary between systems but most commonly as in Hanyu Pinyin the spaces properly occur between semantic divisions (i.e., words) but in practice are often placed between phonetic divisions (i.e., individual characters). In the Wade–Giles system, separate characters within a word were noted by hyphens but this is increasingly uncommon.
 Asterisk
 Mainland Chinese supply chains often use an asterisk in place of a multiplication sign (×) to specify product dimensions. For example "10×200×350" becomes "10*200*350".

Typographic styles

The following are commonly suggested typographical styles; however, they are rarely carried out in practice and often only used when necessary. Proper name marks and title marks are primarily used in textbooks and official documents in Hong Kong, Macau, and Taiwan.

 Proper name mark
 A proper name mark (an underline) is occasionally used, especially in teaching materials and some movie subtitles. When the text runs vertically, the appropriate name mark is written as a line to the characters' left (to the right in some older books).
 Title mark
 A title mark is a wavy underline (U+FE4F ) used instead of the regular book title marks whenever the proper noun mark is used in the same text.
 Emphasis mark
 For emphasis, Chinese uses emphasis marks instead of italic type. Each emphasis mark is a single dot placed under each character to be emphasized (for vertical text, the dot is placed to the right-hand side of each character). Although frequent in printed matter, emphasis marks are rare online, as most word processors do not support them. However, support in HTML has been possible by adding the CSS property text-emphasis-style.
 Death-indication mark
 A death-indication mark [zh] (simplified Chinese: 示亡号; traditional Chinese: 示亡號; pinyin: shìwánghào) marks a person's recent death. Typographically, it consists of a black border around the person's name. It is supported by most word processors and is supported in CSS through the border property. It is used in lists or bibliographical data, for example. Lin Suifang 林穗芳 suggests that this practice may have entered the Chinese language in the fifties when it was supposedly adopted from translations from Russian; he does not cite any sources for this statement, however.

Apostrophe
There is no equivalent of the apostrophe in Chinese. Therefore, it is omitted in translated foreign names such as "O'Neill." Likewise, the hyphen is only used when writing translated foreign names with hyphens. Otherwise, it is not used in Chinese and is omitted when translating compound words.

Use of punctuation marks

Several punctuation marks have ranges of use that differ from the way they are used in English, though some functions may overlap.

  The comma is used to join together clauses that deal with a certain topic or line of thinking. As such, what would appear to an English speaker to be a comma splice is very commonly seen in Chinese writing. Often, the entirety of a long paragraph can consist of clauses joined by commas, with the sole period coming only at the end. Unlike in English, a comma is allowed between a subject and its predicate.
  The semicolon is frequently used to demarcate parallel structures in a paragraph.
  Quotation marks, in addition to being used around quotations, are also commonly used for emphasis and to indicate proper nouns and titles, and also to enclose metaphors that do not explicitly state it is a metaphor. (e.g. 「毛球」跑出來了, i.e. The 'hairball' ran out.)
  The use of a second em dash to close a parenthetical thought is rare. Instead, a comma is usually used, or sometimes no punctuation at all.
 In Pinyin, the apostrophe (') (géyīn fúhào, 'syllable-dividing mark') is before a syllable starting with a vowel (a, o, or e) in a multiple-syllable word when the syllable does not start the word. It is commonly thought that this apostrophe should be used when there could be ambiguity regarding the syllables used (e.g. xian and Xi'an or bing'an and bin'gan).

See also
 East Asian punctuation
 Line breaking rules in East Asian languages

Notes

References

External links
  – official website of the Revised Handbook of Punctuation, December 2008 Edition
  Chinese punctuation marks manual, published by the Ministry of Education of the Republic of China
 Revised Handbook of Punctuation was published in December 2008 by the Ministry of Education of the Republic of China (Taiwan)
  – The PRC's National Standards on the Usage of Punctuation Marks 
 The Unicode Consortium

Punctuation of specific languages
Punctuation